Kanchanpur Union is a union of Basail Upazila, Tangail District, Bangladesh.

Demographics
According to the 2011 Bangladesh census, Kanchanpur Union had 5,701 households and a population of 24,243. The literacy rate (age 7 and over) was 47.3% (male: 50.7%, female: 44.5%).

Education
According to Banglapedia, Kanchanpur Elahia Fazil Madrasa, founded in 1941, is a notable madrassa.

See also
 Union Councils of Tangail District

References

Populated places in Tangail District
Unions of Basail Upazila